Thomaston is an unincorporated community in Hanna Township, LaPorte County, Indiana.

History
The Thomaston station was located at the junction of two railroads.

Geography

References

Unincorporated communities in LaPorte County, Indiana
Unincorporated communities in Indiana